Magik Two: Story of the Fall is the second album in the Magik series by well-known trance DJ and producer Tiësto, who, at the time of the album's release was known as DJ Tiësto; the album was released on Tiësto's Black Hole record label. As with the rest of the Magik series, the album is a live turntable mix.

Track listing
 Delegate vs. Emo-Trance – "Re-Fresh EP: Return To Tazmania" – 5:35
 Dominion – "Fortunes (VOX)" – 3:57
 Allure – "Rejected" – 4:25
 VDM – "Domino Runner" – 4:24
 HH – "Planetary" – 4:10
 Clear View – "Cry For Love" – 4:52
 The Swimmer – "Stand By" – 6:14
 Malcolm McLaren – "The Bell Song" [Lakmé dub] – 3:41
 Binary Finary – "1998" – 3:41
 Dos Deviants – "Elevate" – 6:26
 Luke Cage – "Dawnbreaker" 4:00
 Taucher – "Waters (Phase III)" – 5:13
 Groovezone – "I Love The Music" – 5:03
 Lord Of Tranz featuring DJ Hoxider – "Trancestors" (Original Mix) – 4:20
 Hammock Brothers – "Earth" – 4:33
 Control Freaks – "Subspace Interference" – 3:15

Tiësto compilation albums
1998 compilation albums
Black Hole Recordings albums